Molly B. McKay (born September 9, 1970) is an American attorney and a civil rights activist for lesbian, gay, bisexual and transgender individuals. McKay was the former Co-Executive Director of Marriage Equality California and the former Media Director for Marriage Equality USA. She has also been active in Californians for Same Sex Marriage and the California Freedom to Marry Coalition, and was the Associate Executive Director of Equality California. McKay married her longtime partner Davina Kotulski in 2004 when Gavin Newsom made same sex marriage legal for one day in San Francisco.

LGBT activism
Beginning in February 2001, McKay and her ex-wife, Davina Kotulski, began going to city halls in the Bay Area asking for marriage licenses and organizing annual "Marriage License Counter" protests to draw attention to the hundreds of rights same-sex couples are denied. In the United States, marriage licenses are commonly issued at the local city hall, or office of government for the municipality, with a city employee on one side of a counter, and the applicant on the other side. In response to having her San Francisco Marriage License invalidated, McKay joined her ex-wife Kotulski in organizing the "Marriage Equality Express", an educational bus tour across the United States that culminated in the first national same-sex marriage rally in Washington, DC, on October 11, 2004.  Time and Parade magazines included the rally when citing the importance of same-sex marriage activism as one of the top ten issues of 2004. Molly McKay co-founded Marriage Equality California in 2004, along with several other activists, and continues to work with Marriage Equality USA.

When Marriage Equality California merged with Equality California in 2004, McKay led the Marriage Equality Project for the joint organization becoming Equality California's Field Director. McKay eventually left the organization in 2006 to rejoin Marriage Equality California's prior parent organization Marriage Equality USA.

Legal marriage and separation
McKay and her ex-wife, Kotulski, were the 17th same-sex couple married in San Francisco in 2004 and have appeared together on CNN, Newsweek, Time and USA Today. They are featured in three documentaries, the 2005 Carmen Goodyear- and Laurie York-directed Freedom to Marry (shown in seven countries and featured on PBS), the Geoff Callan and Mike Shaw 2007 release, Pursuit of Equality, and  I Will, I Do, We Did following the San Francisco marriages that took place in 2004. They have also appeared on several television shows including American Quest, documenting the National "Marriage Equality Express", and a Queer Nation TV special in New Zealand.

In June 2011 McKay announced that she and Kotulski had separated, ending their 15-year relationship.

Leadership awards
In 2003, McKay and her ex-wife received the "Defenders of Love" Award from the East Bay Pride Committee, and in 2004, she received the "Saints Alive" award from the San Francisco Metropolitan Community Church and was "sainted" by the Sisters of Perpetual Indulgence for her activism and advocacy for same-sex marriage. In 2006, Kotulski and McKay received the Michael "Switzer Leadership Award" from New Leaf Counseling Center in San Francisco.

Molly McKay has been recognized for her individual contributions as well. She received the Harvey Milk Democratic Club Community Service Award (2005), the Alice B. Toklas Community Service Award (2008), and GLOBE Community Service Award (2008).

Marriage Equality Caravan
San Francisco Chronicle articles on Marriage Equality Caravan:
October 5, 2004 "Taking gay marriage on the road Same-sex couples, supporters embark on bus trip across country" Marriage Equality Caravan
October 6, 2004 "Battle over Same-Sex Marriage" Marriage Equality Caravan
October 7, 2004 "A Grim Anniversary" Marriage Equality Caravan
October 8, 2004 "Tension Grips Caravan" Marriage Equality Caravan
October 9, 2004 "Freedom Riders Loaded with Tech" Marriage Equality Caravan
October 10, 2004 "Marriage rights caravan gets lots of 'no thanks' from gays along road." Marriage Equality Caravan
October 11, 2004 "Canvassing the nation for gay marriage rights Activists visit home towns en route to D.C. rally today" Marriage Equality Caravan
October 12, 2004 "Marriage equality caravan joins spirited rally in D.C.Tired but happy, couples renew vows"
Marriage Equality Caravan and Marriage Equality DC Rally

References

Further reading

2004 
 http://www.washblade.com/print.cfm?content_id=2122  (February 6, 2004)
 https://www.npr.org/2004/02/13/1674572/san-francisco-officials-perform-same-sex-marriages (February 13, 2004)
 https://web.archive.org/web/20070825132422/http://www.ephemera.org/archives/346.html
 https://web.archive.org/web/20060716021053/http://www.sfgate.com/cgi-bin/object/article?o=0&f=%2Fc%2Fa%2F2004%2F02%2F13%2FMNGNH509QT1.DTL
 http://www.indybay.org/newsitems/2004/02/14/16703031.php
 http://www.latimes.com/news/local/la-me-celebration16-2008may16,0,2254757.story
 Interview with Molly McKay (February 14, 2004) - http://www.accessmylibrary.com/coms2/summary_0286-20354376_ITM
 Los Angeles Times’ Rights vs. Obligations of Marriage (February 19, 2004) - http://articles.latimes.com/2004/feb/19/local/me-marriage19
 Senate kills gay marriage ban / Activists hail defeat of constitutional amendment—backers vow to try again (July 15, 2004) - http://www.sfchroniclemarketplace.com/cgi-bin/object/article?f=/c/a/2004/07/15/MNGKE7LMNO1.DTL&o=0&type=printable

2005
 Berkeley Daily Planet's Commentary: Jerry Brown's Wedding Highlights The Need for Marriage Equality (June 28, 2005) - http://www.berkeleydailyplanet.com/issue/2005-06-28/article/21727?headline=Commentary-Jerry-Brown-s-Wedding-Highlights-The-Need-for-Marriage-Equality-By-MOLLY-McKAY
 Judge Strikes Down Same-Sex Marriage Ban (March 14, 2005)- http://www.zimbio.com/Molly+McKay/pictures/pro
 Remember San Francisco's gay marriages? Forget it (August 12, 2004) - http://www.boingboing.net/2004/08/12/remember-san-francis.html

2007
 Pride at Work's Longshoremen Grant Retroactive Pension Benefits to Surviving Domestic Partner (August 23, 2007) - https://web.archive.org/web/20071030002827/http://prideatwork.org/page.php?id=533

2008
 San Francisco Chronicle's Bay Area demonstrations condemn Prop. 8 (November 15, 2008) - http://www.sfgate.com/cgi-bin/article.cgi?f=/c/a/2008/11/15/BAIA145AQ9.DTL&type=politics&tsp=1
 New York Times’ Gay Marriage Ban Inspires New Wave of Activists (December 9, 2008) - https://www.nytimes.com/2008/12/10/us/10marriage.html
 San Francisco Chronicle's Same-sex marriage backers hit Capitol, churches (November 10, 2008) - http://www.sfgate.com/cgi-bin/object/article?f=/c/a/2008/11/10/MN4E141B3P.DTL&o=1
 USA Today's Gay couples rush to wed ahead of Calif. Election (October 14, 2008) - https://www.usatoday.com/news/nation/2008-10-14-3874612028_x.htm
 California Chronicle's ELLEN DEGENERES COMMENDED BY MARRIAGE EQUALITY (October 3, 2008) - https://web.archive.org/web/20090122081304/http://californiachronicle.com/articles/view/76349
 Boston Edge's Same-sex marriage pioneer Del Martin dies at 87 (August 27, 2008) - http://www.edgeboston.com/index.php?ch=news&sc=glbt&sc3=&id=79529&pf=1
One Month Anniversary Of Marriage In California (July 20, 2008) - https://web.archive.org/web/20090122060101/http://blog.protectmarriageequality.com/2008/07/20/one-month-anniversary-of-marriage-in-california/
 CBS News’ Census Won't Report Gay Marriage (July 18, 2008) - http://www.cbsnews.com/stories/2008/07/18/national/main4271220.shtml?source=RSSattr=HOME_4271220
 Miami Herald's Census won't recognize gay marriages in 2010 count (July 2008) -
http://miamiherald.typepad.com/gaysouthflorida/2008/07/census-wont-rec.html
 USA Today's Gay couples tie the knot in California (June 16, 2008) -
https://www.usatoday.com/news/nation/2008-06-16-gaymarriage_N.htm#uslPageReturn
 San Francisco Sentinel's ACROSS CALIFORNIA, SAME-SEX COUPLES MAKE CIVIL RIGHTS HISTORY (June 16, 2008) - http://www.sanfranciscosentinel.com/?p=13908 
 The Hole In The Quilt And A Historic Moment (May 30, 2008) -
http://www.orato.com/current-events/2008/05/30/hole-quilt-and-historic-moment
 Video California Supreme Court Ruling: Same-Sex Marriage (May 26, 2008)
http://www.orato.com/current-events/2008/05/26/california-supreme-court-ruling-same-sex-marriage
 The Constitutionality of Prop. 22 (February 28, 2008) - http://cityonahillpress.com/article.php?id=1072

2009
 Lavender Newswire (January 5, 2009) - http://news.lavenderliberal.com/2009/01/05/marriage-equality-usa-releases-first-report-summarizing-failures-of-no-on-8-campaign/

External links
 https://web.archive.org/web/20170920001216/http://pursuitofequality.com/, Award-winning documentary about same-sex marriage in San Francisco
 http://www.freedomtomarry.tv

1970 births
Activists from the San Francisco Bay Area
American women lawyers
California Democrats
American LGBT rights activists
Living people
Lawyers from San Francisco
21st-century American women